Guillermo Lorenzana Ragazzone (born 5 January 1956) is a former soccer player from El Salvador.

Club career
Ragazzone played for Atlético Marte in the 1985 league championship decider against Alianza, which Marte won 5-2 after extra time. In 1989, he played the championship final for Cojutepeque, this time losing out to Luis Ángel Firpo.

International career
Ragazzone represented El Salvador at the 1975 Pan American Games and was a non-playing El Salvador squad member at the 1982 FIFA World Cup in Spain. He represented his country in 2 games during the 1990 FIFA World Cup qualifying rounds.

FESFUT
Ragazzone was head of the technical department of FESFUT, the Salvadoran Football Association, but he left FESFUT in July 2008 after disagreements with federation president Rodrigo Calvo.

References

External links
 Atlético Marte 1981 squad photo - CD Atletico Marte
 Atlético Marte 1986-1987 squad photo - CD Atletico Marte

1956 births
Living people
Sportspeople from San Salvador
Association football forwards
Salvadoran footballers
Salvadoran people of Italian descent
Pan American Games competitors for El Salvador
Footballers at the 1975 Pan American Games
El Salvador international footballers
1982 FIFA World Cup players
C.D. Atlético Marte footballers